Audio is the debut album by Blue Man Group, released on December 7, 1999, through Virgin Records. The album was nominated for the Grammy Award for Best Pop Instrumental Album.

This album was released in two versions:  The DVD had 5.1-channel versions of the music in both DVD-Video (using Dolby Digital) and DVD-Audio formats (one on each side) and a CD that had a 2-channel stereo mix of each track.

A behind-the-scenes video of the album is viewable on a promotional 2000 VHS known as Audio Video. This video is also included as a bonus on the Audio 5.1 Surround Sound DVD.

Reception

Heather Phares of AllMusic rated Audio three out of five stars. She explained that it "reflects over a decade's worth of musical and theatrical innovation." Although she stated that "the spectacle of the group playing its sculptural, surreal-looking instruments is absent from the album," she concluded her review by calling it "an album that proves the Blue Man Group is as innovative in the studio as it is onstage."

Track listing

Personnel
Producer - Todd Perlmutter
Engineer - Andrew Schneider
Mastered By - Bob Ludwig
Mixed By - Mike Fraser

Blue Man Group
Phil Stanton -  Performer [Air Poles, Extension Cord Bull Roarer, Ribbon Crasher], Percussion [Drumbone, Tubulum, Mid-octave PVC, Backpack Tubulum, Dumpster], Drums [Utne, Drum Wall, Phil Drum], Cimbalom, Timpani
Matt Goldman - Performer [Air Poles, Ribbon Crasher], Percussion [Low Octave PVC, Drumbone, Backpack PVC, Dumpster], Cimbalom, Bass [Upside Down], Gong [Shaker], Drums [Utne]
Chris Wink - Performer [Air Poles], Percussion [Doppler Toms, Tubulum, Drumbone, High-octave PVC, Dumpster, Backpack Tubulum, Piano Smasher], Cimbalom, Shaker [Utne], Drums [Drum Wall], Cuica
Larry Heinemann - Chapman Stick, Bass, Guitar [Baritone], Cuica
Ian Pai - Drums [Drum Wall, Phil Drum], Percussion [Aronophonic, Quellum Grill]
Christian Dyas - Zither, Bass, Guitar [12 String], Electronics [Electric Dog Toy]
Todd Perlmutter - Percussion, Drums [Drum Kit, Left Side Double Drum Kit, Drum Wall, Toy Drum, Phil Drum]

Additional musicians
Jamie Edwards - Performer [Air Poles] (tracks: 1, 4, 14)
Chris Bowen - Drums [Drum Wall] (track: 7)
Clem Waldman - Drums [Drum Wall] (track: 5)
Cräg Rodriguez - Drums [Drum Wall] (track: 7), Percussion (Dumpster) (track: 12)
Jeff Quay - Drums [Right Side Double Drum Kit] (tracks: 2, 4, 7, 8, 12 to 14) & [Drum Wall] (tracks: 5 & 13)
Byron Estep - Guitar (tracks: 5, 7 & 9)
John Kimbrough - Guitar (track: 7) 
Bradford Reed - Zither (tracks: 2, 4, 8, 13 & 14)
David Corter - Zither (tracks: 8, 9, 12, 13)
Elvis Lederer - Zither (track: 1) & Zither [Pressaphonic](track: 5) 
Jens Fischer - Zither (tracks: 2, 4, 6, 11, 13 & 14)

References

External links
Audio at BlueMan.com

Blue Man Group albums
1999 debut albums